Rushville Township is one of twelve townships in Rush County, Indiana. As of the 2010 census, its population was 7,897 and it contained 3,577 housing units.

History
Rushville Township was organized in 1823. The township was named for Benjamin F. Rush, signer of the Declaration of Independence.

The East Hill Cemetery, Archibald M. Kennedy House, and Norris Ford Covered Bridge are listed on the National Register of Historic Places.

Geography

Cities and towns
 Rushville

Unincorporated towns
 Circleville at 
(This list is based on USGS data and may include former settlements.)

References

External links
 Indiana Township Association
 United Township Association of Indiana

Townships in Rush County, Indiana
Townships in Indiana